Diplacodon (Greek: "double" (diplos), "point" (aki), "teeth" (odontes)) is a genus of prehistoric odd-toed ungulates in the family Brontotheriidae. It was the size of a rhinoceros, with the last two upper premolars molar-like.

A new species, D. gigan, was described by Matthew C. Mihlbachler in 2011, from the United States.

References 

Brontotheres
Fossil taxa described in 1875